Baker Farm is a historic home and farm located at Keedysville, Washington County, Maryland, United States. The house is a two-story, four-bay limestone structure with a two-story, four-bay limestone addition.

Background
It was constructed during the 1780s. It has operated as a farm since the 18th century.

The Baker Farm was listed on the National Register of Historic Places in 1978.

References

External links
, including photo in 1998, at Maryland Historical Trust

Houses on the National Register of Historic Places in Maryland
Houses in Washington County, Maryland
National Register of Historic Places in Washington County, Maryland